Kampong Subok is a village in Brunei-Muara District, Brunei. It is also a neighbourhood in the capital Bandar Seri Begawan. The population was 2,681 in 2016. It is one of the villages within Mukim Kota Batu. The postcode is BD2717.

The village is home to the headquarters of the Ministry of Foreign Affairs.

References 

Villages in Brunei-Muara District
Neighbourhoods in Bandar Seri Begawan